Mahmut Eroğlu (16 March 1930 – December 2018) was a Turkish alpine skier. He competed in two events at the 1956 Winter Olympics.

References

1930 births
2018 deaths
Turkish male alpine skiers
Olympic alpine skiers of Turkey
Alpine skiers at the 1956 Winter Olympics
People from Sarıkamış
20th-century Turkish people